The play-offs of the 2015 Fed Cup Asia/Oceania Zone Group I were the final stages of the Group I Zonal Competition involving teams from Asia and Oceania. Using the positions determined in their pools, the eight teams faced off to determine their placing in the 2015 Fed Cup Asia/Oceania Zone Group I.  advanced to World Group II Play-offs, and 
relegated to the Asia/Oceania Zone Group II.

Pool results

Promotion play-off 
The first placed teams of the two pools were drawn in head-to-head rounds. The winner advanced to the World Group II Play-offs.

Japan vs. Kazakhstan

3rd place play-off
The second placed teams of the two pools were drawn in head-to-head rounds to find third place teams.

South Korea vs. China

5th place play-off
The third placed teams of the two pools were drawn in head-to-head rounds to find fifth place teams.

Uzbekistan vs. Thailand

Relegation play-off 
The last placed teams of the two pools were drawn in head-to-head rounds. The loser was relegated down to Asia/Oceania Zone Group II in 2016.

Hong Kong vs. Chinese Taipei

Final placements 

  advanced to World Group II play-offs.
  were relegated to Asia/Oceania Group II in 2016.

See also 
 Fed Cup structure

References

External links 
 Fed Cup website

2015 Fed Cup Asia/Oceania Zone